Jules Charles Stanislas Boedt (3 July 1884 – 2 October 1966) was a Flemish-Belgian lawyer and liberal politician.

He was a municipal council member in Bruges, a member of the Belgian parliament, and president of the Liberaal Vlaams Verbond (1928–1934).

Sources
 Jules Boedt
 Van Causenbroeck, B., Nieuwe Encyclopedie van de Vlaamse Beweging, Tielt-Utrecht, Lannoo, 1998, 3 vol., p. 522-523.

1884 births
1966 deaths
Jurists from Bruges
Politicians from Bruges
Flemish activists
Flemish lawyers